Hyloxalus toachi is a species of frog in the family Dendrobatidae. It is endemic to northwestern Ecuador.

Description
Males measure  and females  in snout–vent length.

Habitat and conservation
Natural habitats of Hyloxalus toachi are humid tropical and very humid premontane forests as well as lowland grasslands.  
It is a locally common species that can be threatened by habitat loss.

References

toachi
Amphibians of Ecuador
Endemic fauna of Ecuador
Amphibians described in 1995
Taxonomy articles created by Polbot